The Canterville Ghost is a one-act opera by Gordon Getty to the composers own libretto after the 1887 short story by Oscar Wilde. The opera was first performed in 2015 at Leipzig Opera, with  conducting the Gewandhaus Orchestra. It was performed as a pair with his opera Usher House at the Center for Contemporary Opera in New York in August 2017.

Recording
Alexandra Hutton (soprano), Jean Broekhuizen (mezzo-soprano), Denise Wernly (mezzo-soprano), Rachel Marie Hauge (mezzo-soprano), Timothy Oliver (tenor), Jonathan Michie (baritone), Anooshah Golesorkhi (baritone), Matthew Trevino (bass) Leipzig Opera and Gewandhausorchester, Matthias Foremny. 1 SACD Pentatone

References

External links
 "The Canterville Ghost", gordongetty.com

Operas
2015 operas
Operas by Gordon Getty
English-language operas
Operas set in England
Operas based on literature
Operas based on works by Oscar Wilde
One-act operas